Roosevelt I. Polite (September 3, 1912 – March 14, 1981) was a Republican member of the Pennsylvania House of Representatives.

References

Republican Party members of the Pennsylvania House of Representatives
1912 births
1981 deaths
20th-century American politicians